Sitou is a town in Linqu County, Weifang, in Shandong province, China. , it administers the following 34 villages: 
Sitou Village
Gongjiazhuang Village
Sunjiazhuang Village
Dangu Village
Fuquan Village
Qingya Village
Dongyu Village
Lüxia Village
Jizishan Village
Yutubu Village
Luozhuang Village
Xintai Village
Tumen Village
Wangzhuang Village
Yangliuzhai Village
Hekou Village
Jijiazhuang Village
Yangzhuang Village
Hezhuang Village
Shifo Village
Nanxi'an Village
Taohua Village
Huangshan Village
Gushan Village
Ruizhuang Village
Qiaogou Village
Lugao Village
Shijiahe Village
Yujiazhuang Village
Zhangjiazhuang Village
Dagudong Village
Mianguqian Village
Liuzi Village
Laozhuangzi Village

References

Township-level divisions of Shandong
Linqu County